Alexander–Withrow House is a historic home located at Lexington, Virginia.  It was built about 1790, and significantly modified in the 1850s when the street was lowered by about 10 feet.  The upper stories of diaper patterned brick sit on a first level of limestone.  It has a shallow hipped roof and four corner chimneys.  The original front entrance opens onto a small balcony with a decorative cast-iron balustrade supported on large cast-iron brackets.  The house was renovated by the Historic Lexington Foundation in 1969–1970.

It was listed on the National Register of Historic Places in 1971. It is located in the Lexington Historic District.

Gallery

References

External links
 

Historic American Buildings Survey in Virginia
Houses on the National Register of Historic Places in Virginia
Houses completed in 1798
Houses in Lexington, Virginia
National Register of Historic Places in Lexington, Virginia
Individually listed contributing properties to historic districts on the National Register in Virginia